The Ilyushin Il-38 "Dolphin" (NATO reporting name: May) is a maritime patrol aircraft and anti-submarine warfare aircraft designed in the Soviet Union. It was a development of the Ilyushin Il-18 turboprop transport.

Design and development
The Il-38 is an adaptation of the four-engined turboprop Ilyushin Il-18 for use as a maritime patrol aircraft for the Soviet Navy. It met a requirement to counter American ballistic missile submarines. The Communist Party Central Committee and the Council of Ministers issued a joint directive on 18 June 1960, calling for a prototype to be ready for trials by the second quarter of 1962. The fuselage, wing, tail unit and engine nacelles were the same as the Il-18 and it had the same powerplant and flight deck. An aerodynamic prototype of the Il-38 first flew on 28 September 1961, with the first production aircraft following in September 1967. Production continued until 1972, when the longer-range and more versatile Tupolev Tu-142 derivative of the Tupolev Tu-95 strategic bomber had entered service.

The airframe is based on the Il-18, with the wings moved forward 3 m (9.84 ft). Unlike the Il-18, only the forward fuselage of the Il-38 is pressurised. The tail contains a MAD, while under the forward fuselage a Berkut ("Golden Eagle") search radar (named "Wet Eye" by NATO) is housed in a bulged radome. There are two internal weapons bays, one forward of the wing, housing sonobuoys and one behind the wing housing weapons.

Some Western sources state that 58 were produced; the commander of the ASW squadron at Ostrov has stated that Soviet Naval Aviation received 35, of which about thirty remain in service with Russian Naval Aviation. Five were passed to India in 1977/8. In the mid-1990s it seems the Tu-204/Tu-214 airliner won a competition against the Beriev A-40/Be-42 amphibious plane to replace the Il-38 in Russian service, but a lack of funds crippled the project. More recently an A-40 variant seems to be under development to replace the Il-38.

India received three ex-Soviet Naval Aviation Il-38s in 1977, with two more arriving in 1983. Indian modifications included fitting pylons to the fuselage side to carry the Sea Eagle anti-ship missile. The Il-38s of the Indian Navy have been sent back to Russia for upgrades. They will incorporate the new Sea Dragon avionic suite, incorporating a new radar, a Forward looking infrared turret under the nose and an electronic intelligence system housed in a box-like structure mounted on struts above the forward fuselage. Three upgraded aircraft, designated Il-38 SD, have been delivered to the Indian Navy. Indian Il-38 can also fire Kh-35E missiles.

Operational history

One prototype was lost in the early 1970s when it was forced to ditch at sea.

The Il-38 was operated by units in the Soviet Northern, Pacific and Baltic fleets. In March 1968 a squadron of Il-38s deployed to Cairo in Egypt, flown by Soviet crews but in Egyptian markings, until withdrawn in 1972. Il-38s continued to deploy overseas through the Cold War, flying from Aden in South Yemen, Asmara in what was then Ethiopia, Libya and Syria. Two Il-38s were attacked on the ground in a commando raid and at least one was destroyed by Eritrean People's Liberation Front fighters in 1984 at Asmara. After the Cold War and the breakup of the Soviet Union, Il-38s continue in service with the Russian Navy's Arctic and Pacific Fleets.

The type made its first visit to a NATO base in 1995, at NAS Jacksonville in United States. Its first appearance at an airshow in the West was at the 1996 Royal International Air Tattoo in United Kingdom.

A midair collision occurred on 1 October 2002, during the Indian squadron's silver jubilee celebrations. IN302 and IN304, which were flying parallel to each other, collided above the Dabolim airport in Goa. All twelve aircrew (six aboard each aircraft) were killed and both aircraft were destroyed.

Variants

Il-38
Production aircraft
Il-38M
Modified with a receiver probe as part of a probe and drogue air refueling system. System not adopted.
Il-38MZ
Tanker variant of the Il-38. Prototype only
Il-38N
Improved variant sometimes referred to as Il-38SD for Sea Dragon, which is a new search and tracking system. The Russian Navy version is equipped with the Novella P-38 system. Novella P-38 is able to find air targets at ranges of up to 90 kilometres and follow surface objects within a radius of 320 kilometres, can track 32 above- and underwater targets simultaneously. 8 aircraft have been delivered to the Russian Navy. Modernised anti-submarine planes have entered into service with Russia’s Pacific and Northern Fleets.

Operators

 Indian Naval Air Arm

 Russian Naval Aviation

Former operators

 Soviet Naval Aviation

Specifications (Il-38)

See also

References

Lake, Jon. "Russia's Submarine Killer: Ilyushin IL-38 May". Air International, February 2005, Vol 68 No.2. Stamford, UK:Key Publishing. pp. 30–36.
Gordon, Yefim and Dmitriy Komissarov, Ilyushin Il-18/-20/-22; A Versatile Turboprop Transport, Midland Publishing:Hinckley England. 2004.

Il-038
1960s Soviet patrol aircraft
Four-engined tractor aircraft
Low-wing aircraft
Four-engined turboprop aircraft
Aircraft first flown in 1961